The 1967 Wyoming Cowboys football team represented the University of Wyoming in the 1967 NCAA University Division football season. Led by sixth-year head coach Lloyd Eaton, they were members of the Western Athletic Conference (WAC) and played their home games on campus at War Memorial Stadium in Laramie.

Wyoming won all ten games in the regular season, had the nation's best rushing defense, and was invited to the Sugar Bowl in New Orleans on New Year's Day. On a fourteen-game winning streak, underdog Wyoming led unranked LSU 13–0 at halftime, but were outscored 20–0 in the 

The Cowboys outscored their opponents 289 to 119; they were led on offense by quarterback Paul Toscano and running back Jim Kiick.

Schedule

 The AP rankings included only the top ten this season; the final poll was released in late November.

NFL/AFL Draft
Five Cowboys were selected in the 1968 NFL/AFL Draft, the second common draft, which lasted seventeen rounds (462 selections).

^ Toscano was the Wyoming quarterback

Awards and honors
 Mike Dirks, All-American: (Football Writers of America, Look Magazine, Newspaper Enterprise Association)
 Mike Dirks, First Team, All-Western Athletic Conference

References

Wyoming
Wyoming Cowboys football seasons
Western Athletic Conference football champion seasons
Wyoming Cowboys football